Greg King (born 24 April 1988) is an English rugby union player, formerly of the Worcester Warriors in the Premiership. He moved to Moseley for the 2011-12 RFU Championship where he is currently captain of the first Team.

He plays at centre.

External links
Worcester Warriors profile

1988 births
Living people
Worcester Warriors players
Moseley Rugby Football Club players